Lambda is a 2022 science fiction novel written by British artist and author David Musgrave.

Overview
A police officer connects with a strange race of aquatic humans.

References

2022 British novels
British science fiction novels
Novels set in the future